Sergiusz Żymełka (born 10 April 1991) is a Polish actor, best known for his role in the comedy series Rodzina Zastępcza, and is currently appearing in a spin-off.

Żymełka was born in Warsaw.  He made his film debut in 1996.

Filmography
2004 - Na dobre i na złe (guest appearance)
2002 - Smutne miasteczko (TV)
2002 - Święta polskie: Miss Mokrego Podkoszulka (TV)
2001 - Wtorek
2001 - Tam, gdzie żyją Eskimosi
2001 - Noc czerwcowa (TV)
2001 - Na dobre i na złe (guest appearance)
2001 - Beatryks Cenci (TV)
2000 - Egoiści
2000 - Stół (TV)
1999 - Lalek (TV) 
1999 - Perły szczęścia nie dają 1999 - Dwustu służących i śnieg (TV)
1999-2009 - Rodzina zastępcza
1998 - Złoto dezerterów
1998 - Książę Chochlik (Movie) 
1998 - Swoja (Movie)
1998 - Walizka (Movie)

External links

Unofficial Fanpage
Filmweb
Russian Fanpage

1991 births
Living people
Polish male child actors
Polish male film actors
Polish male television actors
Male actors from Warsaw